Richard von Schirach (born 11 February 1942 in Munich) is a German sinologist and author.

He studied at LMU, where he earned a doctorate in Chinese literature in 1974. In 1973 he published a German version of the autobiography of Chinese Emperor Puyi. Richard von Schirach is a member of the noble Sorbian Schirach family.  He is a son of the Nazi war criminal Baldur von Schirach, and a grandson of Hitler’s official photographer Heinrich Hoffmann. He has published a book about his father. He is the father of the philosopher Ariadne von Schirach and of the author Benedict Wells.

Books 
 Pu Yi: Ich war Kaiser von China: Vom Himmelssohn zum neuen Menschen. Hanser, Munich 1973.
 Hsü Chih-mo und die Hsin-yüeh-Gesellschaft: Ein Beitrag zur Neuen Literatur Chinas. Dissertation, LMU, 1974.
 Der Schatten meines Vaters. Hanser, Munich, Vienna 2005,  
 Die Nacht der Physiker: Heisenberg, Hahn, Weizsäcker und die deutsche Bombe.

References

Literature 
 Norbert Lebert, Stephan Lebert: Denn Du trägst meinen Namen. Das schwere Erbe der prominenten Nazi-Kinder. Blessing, München 2000, .

External links 
 

1942 births
German sinologists
Richard
Living people